Zhen may refer to:

 Towns of China, called zhèn in Chinese
 True (China), zhen in Chinese
 Zhen (surname), a Chinese surname
 Balhae Kingdom, originally called Zhen in Chinese
 Lady Zhen (183-221), wife of Cao Pi of Cao Wei of the Three Kingdoms
 Empress Zhen (Cao Fang) (died 251), empress of Cao Wei, wife of Cao Feng
 Empress Dowager Ci'an (1837-1881), Noble Consort Zhen to the Xianfeng Emperor of the Qing Dynasty
 Empress Zhen (Liao dynasty) (died 951), wife of Emperor Shizong of Liao
 Zhēn( or ) is dadeumi which is laundry tool.

See also
 Zhen Zhen, female giant panda 
 Zhenniao, a legendary creature